The Europe Zone was one of the two regional zones of the 1934 International Lawn Tennis Challenge.

10 teams entered the Europe Zone, with the winner going on to compete in the Inter-Zonal Final against the winner of the America Zone. Due to the large number of entries in Europe, a "Qualifying Round" system was introduced in order to better manage the number of teams competing. European teams which lost before the 1933 Europe Zone semifinals would play-off against each other for the right to compete in the 1934 Europe Zone main draw alongside the 1933 Europe Zone semifinalists and other non-European teams. 17 teams entered the Qualifying Rounds.

Australia defeated Czechoslovakia in the final, and went on to face the United States in the Inter-Zonal Final.

Qualifying draw
European teams which lost in the first round, second round or quarterfinals of the 1933 Europe Zone competed in the new qualifying round for four places in the 1934 Europe Zone main draw.

Draw

First round

Belgium vs. Hungary

Second round

Ireland vs. Germany

Denmark vs. Greece

Norway vs. Yugoslavia

Austria vs. Spain

Sweden vs. Belgium

Monaco vs. Switzerland

Poland vs. Italy

Netherlands vs. Romania

Qualifying round

Germany vs. Denmark

Yugoslavia vs. Austria

Switzerland vs. Belgium

Netherlands vs. Italy

Main draw

Draw

First round

France vs. Austria

Switzerland vs. India

Quarterfinals

Australia vs. Japan

France vs. Germany

Italy vs. Switzerland

Czechoslovakia vs. New Zealand

Semifinals

France vs. Australia

Italy vs. Czechoslovakia

Final

Czechoslovakia vs. Australia

References

External links
Davis Cup official website

Davis Cup Europe/Africa Zone
Europe Zone
International Lawn Tennis Challenge
1933 in tennis